The LAV Madrid-Toledo  is a Spanish high-speed rail line that connects the cities of Madrid and Toledo, a distance of approximately .

The service was inaugurated in 2005.

Route 
The route shares the first  with the Madrid–Seville high-speed rail line. The trip takes thirty minutes.

Features 
The new portion of the line was designed to support maximum speeds of 270 km/h, which is also the maximum speed allowed by the common core  shared with the LAV Madrid-Sevilla/Málaga.

Toledo Station 

The arrival of high speed rail to Toledo made clear the need to adapt the station to new needs. This was done by rehabilitating the historic station building, designed by architect Narciso Claveria in the Neo-Mudéjar style and opened in 1919.

Other amenities include an outdoor parking area. The lot is paved, lit, and covers an area of 7,500 square meters with capacity for 325 vehicles.

Special Features 
A highlight of the line is a one-mile viaduct spanning the Tagus River and the Valdecir stream.

References 

High-speed railway lines in Spain
Rail transport in Madrid